Razumovka is a rural locality (a selo) in Razdolnensky Selsoviet, Rodinsky District, Altai Krai, Russia. The population was 329 as of 2013. There are 8 streets.

Geography 
Razumovka is located 40 km west of Rodino (the district's administrative centre) by road. Tizek is the nearest rural locality.

References 

Rural localities in Rodinsky District